The 1993 Copa Centenario de la AFA Final was a football match played on January 30, 1994, between Gimnasia y Esgrima La Plata and River Plate to determine the Copa Centenario de la AFA champion.

The match was played at Gimnasia y Esgrima's venue, Estadio Juan Carmelo Zerillo in La Plata. Gimnasia y Esgrima was managed by Roberto Perfumo after the coach team composed by Carlos Ramaciotti and Edgardo Sbrissa resigned after five rounds played.

Gimnasia y Esgrima reached the final after eliminating arch-rival Estudiantes de La Plata, Newell's Old Boys, Argentinos Juniors and Belgrano de Córdoba.

The Copa Centenario was the second title achieved by Gimnasia y Esgrima, the first after the Primera División championship won in 1929. Guillermo Barros Schelotto was the topscorer with 2 goals.

Match details

|valign="top" width="50%"|

|}

References

c
c
CEn
Football in Buenos Aires Province